The Daju languages are spoken in isolated pockets by the Daju people across a wide area of Sudan and Chad. In Sudan, they are spoken in parts of the regions of Kordofan, Darfur, in Chad they are spoken in Wadai. The Daju languages belong to the Eastern Sudanic subfamily of Nilo-Saharan.

Languages
The Daju languages are sub-classified as follows, following Stevenson (1956).

 Eastern Daju:
 Shatt in the Shatt Hills southwest of Kadugli. (The name "Shatt" is also applied to other unrelated languages of the area.)
 Subori in the Nuba Hills, Sudan
 Western Daju:
 Daju Mongo in Dar Daju, Chad
Sila in Dar Sila, Chad
 Nyala around Nyala in Darfur, Sudan
Beigo (extinct) in southern Darfur
 Njalgulgule in South Sudan on the Sopo River

Proto-Daju has been partially reconstructed by Robin Thelwall (1981). In his judgement, the Eastern Daju languages separated from the others perhaps as much as 2,000 years ago, while the Western Daju languages were spread more recently, perhaps by the Daju state which dominated Darfur from about 1200 AD until scattered after the death of Kasi Furogé, the Daju king, and replaced by the Tunjur. The principal phonetic difference between the two branches is the reflex of proto-Daju *ɣ, reflected as Western *r and Eastern *x.

Grammar
The typical verb root in Daju is a monosyllable of the form (C)VC(C). The perfective takes a prefixed k-; the imperfective, a prefixed a(n)-. The verb takes person suffixes, exemplified in Shatt (for the verb "drink" in the imperfective):

Suffixes on nouns serve to mark singulative (-tic, -təs), generic, and plural forms. The typical word order is subject–verb–object in most Daju languages, with exceptions such as Sila, and possessed–possessor.

See also
List of Proto-Daju reconstructions (Wiktionary)

References

 R. C. Stevenson. "A survey of the phonetics and grammatical structure of the Nuba Mountains languages, with particular reference to Otoro, Katcha and Nyimang." Afrika und Übersee 40, 1956-7.
 Thelwall, Robin. 1981. "Lexicostatistical Subgrouping and Reconstruction of the Daju Group" in ed. Thilo C. Schadeberg & Lionel Bender, Nilo-Saharan: Proceedings of the First Nilo-Saharan Linguistics Colloquium, Leiden, September 8–10, 1980. Foris: Dordrecht.
 Thelwall, Robin. 1981. The Daju Language Group. Boston, Spa: British Library Document Supply Centre. Doctoral dissertation, Coleraine: New University of Ulster.

External links
 Nuba Languages and History, Robin Thelwall
 Language Map of Sudan Huffman, Steve

 
Language families
Southern Eastern Sudanic languages